Takafumi (written: 貴文, 貴史, 孝史, 崇文, 岳文, 敬史, 隆文, 隆史 or 隆普美) is a masculine Japanese given name. Notable people with the name include:

, Japanese footballer
, Japanese footballer and manager
, Japanese entrepreneur who founded Livedoor, a website design operation
, Japanese politician
, Japanese guitarist, lyricist, music arranger, and musical artist
, Japanese ski jumper
, Japanese voice actor
, Japanese footballer
, Japanese cyclist
, Japanese footballer
, Japanese speed skater
, Japanese footballer
, Japanese footballer
, Japanese ice hockey player
, Japanese footballer

Japanese masculine given names